A gladiatrix is the female equivalent of the gladiator of ancient Rome.

Gladiatrix or variants may refer to:

 Gladiatrix (comics) a fictional character
 "Gladiatrix", an episode of the TV series Birds of Prey
 "Gladiatrix", a song by Myrkur from the 2017 album Mareridt
 Les Gladiatrices: Blondes vs. Brunes, a 2004 DVD based on a French reality TV show
 Gladiatress, a 2004 British comedy film
 "Gladiatoresses", an episode of Top Model (Scandinavian season 3)
 Gladiatorettes, a fictional cheerleading team from Sweet Valley High

See also

 Gladiator (disambiguation)
 Gladius (disambiguation)